B. V. Ramanaa (born 8 May 1967) is an Indian politician who was a member of the 14th Tamil Nadu Legislative Assembly from the Tiruvallur constituency. He represented the All India Anna Dravida Munnetra Kazhagam party.

Ramanaa was appointed Minister for Handlooms and in November 2011 a cabinet reshuffle by Jayalalithaa resulted in him replacing T. K. M. Chinnayya as Minister for the Environment, with S. Sundararaj taking over the Handlooms portfolio. As a Minister, he handled the portfolios for Commercial Taxes and Registration, Revenue and Milk & Dairy Development in the Government of Tamil Nadu.

During the elections of 2016 , he did not contest as seat was not given to him resulted in constituency being won by Dravida Munnetra Kazhagam's V. G. Raajendran. In 2021 he contested and lost in Thiruvallur constituency by 22207 votes to VGR of DMK

References

External links 
B. V. Ramanaa member profile Tamil Nadu Legislative Assembly

1967 births
Tamil Nadu MLAs 2011–2016
All India Anna Dravida Munnetra Kazhagam politicians
Living people
State cabinet ministers of Tamil Nadu